Bactrothrips is a genus of thrips in the family Phlaeothripidae, first described by Heinrich Hugo Karny in 1912. In , Mound and Tree synonymised the genus, Lasiothrips, with Bactrothrips

Species
 Bactrothrips aberlenci
 Bactrothrips aliceae
 Bactrothrips alluaudi
 Bactrothrips aterrimus
 Bactrothrips atrispinis
 Bactrothrips bancoensis
 Bactrothrips berlandi
 Bactrothrips brevitubus
 Bactrothrips bucculentus
 Bactrothrips buffai
 Bactrothrips carbonarius
 Bactrothrips congoensis
 Bactrothrips cookae
 Bactrothrips delamarei
 Bactrothrips divergens
 Bactrothrips elongatus
 Bactrothrips flectoventris
 Bactrothrips furcatus
 Bactrothrips furvescrus
 Bactrothrips grandis
 Bactrothrips guineaensis
 Bactrothrips guineensis
 Bactrothrips hesperus
 Bactrothrips honoris
 Bactrothrips hoodi
 Bactrothrips houstoni
 Bactrothrips idolomorphus
 Bactrothrips inermis
 Bactrothrips kenyensis
 Bactrothrips kranzae
 Bactrothrips laingi
 Bactrothrips lamottei
 Bactrothrips levidens
 Bactrothrips longisetis
 Bactrothrips longiventris
 Bactrothrips luteus
 Bactrothrips macropteryx
 Bactrothrips malgassus
 Bactrothrips montanus
 Bactrothrips moultoni
 Bactrothrips natalensis
 Bactrothrips nativus
 Bactrothrips nigripes
 Bactrothrips pallidicrus
 Bactrothrips parvidens
 Bactrothrips perplexus
 Bactrothrips pictipes
 Bactrothrips pitkini
 Bactrothrips priesneri
 Bactrothrips propinquus
 Bactrothrips quadrituberculatus
 Bactrothrips titschacki

References

External links
Thrips wiki: ''Bactrothrips

Phlaeothripidae
Thrips
Thrips genera
Taxa named by Heinrich Hugo Karny